A dopamine releasing agent (DRA) is a type of drug which induces the release of dopamine in the body and/or brain.  No selective DRAs are currently known. Many releasing agents of both dopamine and norepinephrine (norepinephrine–dopamine releasing agents, or NDRAs) and of serotonin, norepinephrine, and dopamine are known (serotonin-norepinephrine-dopamine releasing agents, or SNDRAs), however. Serotonin–dopamine releasing agents are much rarer and are not selective for monoamine release. Examples of NDRAs include amphetamine and methamphetamine, and an example of an SNDRA is MDMA. The most selective dopamine releaser is 4-methylaminorex, but it also has considerable activity as a norepinephrine releaser. These drugs are frequently used for recreational purposes and encountered as drugs of abuse.

A closely related type of drug is a dopamine reuptake inhibitor (DRI). Various selective DRIs are known, in contrast to the case of DRAs. It is particularly of note that the mechanism of action at the dopamine transporter (DAT) for dopamine releasers/substrates is entropy-driven (i.e. hydrophobic), whereas for dopamine re-uptake inhibitors it is enthalpy-driven (i.e. conformational change).

There is some, albeit mixed, in vitro evidence that the antidepressant and modestly selective DRI amineptine may in addition to inhibiting the reuptake of dopamine selectively induce the presynaptic release of dopamine without affecting that of norepinephrine or serotonin.

See also
 Monoamine releasing agent
 Norepinephrine–dopamine releasing agent
 Serotonin–dopamine releasing agent
 Serotonin–norepinephrine–dopamine releasing agent

References

External links

 
TAAR1 agonists
VMAT inhibitors